A lyricist is a person who writes lyrics (the spoken words), as opposed to a composer, who writes the song's music which may include but not limited to the melody, harmony, arrangement and accompaniment.

Royalties

A lyricist's income derives from royalties received from original songs. Royalties may range from 50 per cent of the song if it was written primarily with the composer, or less if they wrote the song in collaboration. Songs are automatically copyrighted as soon as they are in tangible forms, such as a recording or sheet music. However, before a song is published or made public, its author or publisher should register it with the Copyright Office at the US Library of Congress to better protect against copyright infringement.

Collaborations

Collaboration takes different forms. Some composers and lyricists work closely together on a song, with each having an input into both words and tune. Usually a lyricist fills in the words to a tune already fully written out. Dorothy Fields worked in this way. Lyricists have often added words to an established tune, as Johnny Burke did with the Erroll Garner jazz standard "Misty". Some partnerships work almost totally independently, for example, Bernie Taupin writes lyrics and hands them over to Elton John, who writes music, with minimum interaction between the two men.

The collaboration of Lennon-McCartney is one of the most successful in history and includes songs such as Yesterday and A Hard Day's Night

Other famous collaborations include Leiber and Stoller and The Rolling Stones lead singer Mick Jagger with Keith Richards

Religious songwriting

In the Christian hymn-singing tradition, many of the popular pieces have words written to fit existing melodies. The Christmas carol "What Child Is This?" had its words set to an old English folk tune that had been a lover's lament, "Greensleeves". The English composer Ralph Vaughan Williams famously set existing poems, by men like William Cowper and Charles Wesley, to traditional folk tunes to create hymns, many of which he published in The English Hymnal. A different way this happened was the marriage of unrelated words and tune, a well-known example being "The Star-Spangled Banner", the national anthem of the United States, with words written by Francis Scott Key strictly as a poem, which was later set to the tune of an old drinking song.

Classical music 

In opera, the librettist is responsible for all text, whether spoken or sung in recitative or aria.

See also
 Singer-songwriter

References

External links 
 

Lyrics
Mass media occupations
Occupations in music
Songwriters